This is a list of authors in the field of antisemitism in alphabetical order.

A 
 Yitzchok Adlerstein
 Theodor W. Adorno
 Götz Aly
 Yitzhak Arad
 Hannah Arendt
 Dan Ariely

B 
 Henryk Baran
 Mitchell G. Bard
 
 Yehuda Bauer
 Zygmunt Bauman
 Joel Beinin
 Wolfgang Benz
 Michael Berenbaum
 Werner Bergmann
 Randolph L. Braham
 Martin Broszat
 Christopher Browning
 Barbara Stern Burstin

C 
 David Cesarani
 Phyllis Chesler
 
 Richard I. Cohen
 Irwin Cotler
 John S. Curtiss

D 
 Lucy Dawidowicz
 Cesare G. De Michelis
 Jacques Derrida
 Alan Dershowitz
 
 
 Debórah Dwork

E 
 Todd Endelman
 David Engel
 Robert Ericksen
 
 Andrew Ezergailis

F 
 Avner Falk
 Michael C. Fenenbock
 Norman Finkelstein
 
 Reuven Firestone
 Jack Fischel
 Abraham Foxman
 Edward Flannery
 Paula Fredriksen
 Lillian C. Freudmann

G 
 Jane Gerber
 Manfred Gerstenfeld
 Sander Gilman
 Andrew Goldberg
 Daniel Goldhagen
 
 Tom Gross

H 
 Arthur Hertzberg
 Raul Hilberg
 David Hirsh
 Colin Holmes
 
 Max Horkheimer

I 
 Jules Isaac

J 
 Amy-Jill Levine
 Josef Joffe
 Steven L. Jacobs

K 
 Jacob Katz
 Brian Klug
 
 Matthias Küntzel

L 
 
 Richard Landes
 Gavin I. Langmuir
 Claude Lanzmann
 Walter Laqueur
 Gisela C. Lebzelter
 Primo Levi
 Emmanuel Levinas
 Richard S. Levy
 Bernard Lewis
 Albert Lindemann
 Deborah Lipstadt
 
 Yaacov Lozowick

M 
 Kevin B. MacDonald
 
 David Meir-Levi
 Albert Memmi

N 
 János Nyíri

O

P 
 Talcott Parsons
 
 
 Léon Poliakov
 Moishe Postone

R 
 
 
 
 
 Amnon Rubinstein

S 
 Jonathan Sacks
 Samuel Sandmel
 Jean-Paul Sartre
 
 Gabriel Schoenfeld
 
 
 
 Charles A. Small
 
 
 Kenneth S. Stern

T 
 Pierre-André Taguieff
 Tilman Tarach

U

V

W 
 Peter Waldbauer
 Bari Weiss (born 1984) - opinion writer and editor
 John Weiss (born 1927)
 Alfred Wiener
 
 Robert Wistrich
 Michael Wolffsohn

X

Y

Z

See also 
 Anti-Zionism
 Bibliography of The Holocaust
 Israel studies 
 Zionism

References